Tiszasziget is a village in Csongrád county, in the Southern Great Plain region of southern Hungary.

Geography

References

Tiszasziget